David Canter (born January 4, 1973) is an American sports agent. He primarily works with NFL players. A graduate of both Ithaca College and the University of Miami School of Law, he received his Bachelor of Science in Sports Management from Ithaca in 1995.

References

External links
ESPN: Confessions of s Sports Agent
Interview, May 9, 2007
BizJournals
ESPN Article
ESPN: From doctor to watchdog to friend

1973 births
Living people
University of Miami School of Law alumni
People from Miramar, Florida
American sports agents
Ithaca Bombers football players